Melissa A. Brown is an American diplomat who had been the Charge d’Affaires of the United States to the Association of Southeast Asian Nations from 2019 to 2021.

Career 
Brown graduated from Georgetown University's Edmund A. Walsh School of Foreign Service. She worked at the Embassy of the United States, Jakarta, among other postings.

In February 2022, she assumed the role of Deputy Assistant Secretary for Maritime and Mainland Southeast Asia. From September 2021 to February 2022, she served as the Deputy Assistant Secretary for Australia, New Zealand, and Pacific Islands and for Economic Policy, succeeding Sandra Oudkirk.

Personal life 
Brown grew up in New Jersey and Jakarta, Indonesia.

References 

Living people
Ambassadors of the United States to ASEAN
American women ambassadors
Ambassadors of the United States
21st-century American diplomats
Year of birth missing (living people)
21st-century American women